The Sieben Hengste is a mountain of the Emmental Alps, located north of Habkern, in the canton of Bern. It is composed of several summits of which the highest (1,955 metres) is named Chibe.

See also
Siebenhengste-Hohgant-Höhle
List of mountains of Switzerland

References

External links
 Sieben Hengste on Hikr

Mountains of the Alps
Mountains of Switzerland
Mountains of the canton of Bern
Emmental Alps
One-thousanders of Switzerland